Lung aspiration may refer to:
Foreign body aspiration
Pulmonary aspiration